Marven Lake is a lake in Cochrane District in the Canadian province of Ontario. It is in or near the geographic township of Marven.

References

Lakes of Cochrane District